Abdul al-Qadir El-Badri (8 December 1921 – 13 February 2003) was a Libyan politician. He served as Prime Minister from 2 July to 25 October 1967. He was born near Abyar.

Early life 
Badri was born in the Alumblytanih region near Biar. He was an only child in a poor family who belonged to the "Awageer" Mujahid tribe, one of the country's largest tribes.  His primary education took place in religious schools. He turned to agriculture and commerce early in life. He married four women and had many children, including 15 daughters..

Career 
He was elected to the House of Representatives of the Barqa government in 1950. He was repeatedly elected as a member of the "Abyar" circle in all parliamentary elections following independence. He won the House of Representatives elections for the Abyear District from December 1952 to December 1960. He became the prime minister of agriculture of Abdul Majeed Ka'bar's government in his last days (September–October 1960). He served as Minister of Economy and Health and Fisheries in the Government of Mohamed Osman (October 1960 to October 1961), and Minister of Industry in the government of Hussein Mazzek (March to October 1965). He became the minister of housing and government property in the same government (October 1965 to April 1967).

References

Prime Ministers of Libya
1921 births
2003 deaths
Economy ministers of Libya
Fisheries ministers of Libya
Health ministers of Libya
Housing ministers of Libya